Seneca Sinclair Wallace (born August 6, 1980) is a former American football quarterback and current assistant coach for John Paul II High School. He was drafted by the Seattle Seahawks in the fourth round of the 2003 NFL Draft. He played college football at Iowa State. He was also a member of the Cleveland Browns, New Orleans Saints, San Francisco 49ers and Green Bay Packers.

Early years
Wallace attended Cordova High School in Rancho Cordova, California, and was a letterman in football and basketball. In basketball, he won All-Sierra Conference honors and All-Sacramento honorable mention honors.

College career
Wallace attended Sacramento City College in order to stay close to home at his mother's request. After initially receiving only three offers, two at wide receiver, Wallace transferred to Iowa State University for his junior and senior year.

Wallace received widespread notice in 2002 while with the Iowa State Cyclones in a play famously known as "The Run," in which he traversed back to the 32 yard line before running it in for a 12-yard touchdown versus Texas Tech. It was later estimated that he ran 135 yards on the 12 yard touchdown rush. While quarterbacking the Iowa State Cyclones in 2001 and 2002, he threw 26 touchdowns and 27 interceptions.

Statistics

Professional career

Seattle Seahawks

He was drafted in the fourth round of the 2003 NFL Draft out of Iowa State University. It is widely thought his draft value dropped because of his insistence that he play quarterback for the team, rather than wide receiver. Intrigued by his athleticism, the Seattle Seahawks gave him that chance. Wallace made his mark in the 2005 NFL Playoffs when he caught an acrobatic 28-yard pass from Matt Hasselbeck in the NFC Championship game against former Seahawks cornerback Ken Lucas of the Carolina Panthers.

In 2006, Wallace started in four games as quarterback after an injury to Hasselbeck's right knee. Under his leadership, the team won two games and lost two. His passer rating was 76.2 for the 2006 season, passing just under 1,000 yards, throwing 8 touchdowns and 7 interceptions.

In 2007, Mike Holmgren began using Wallace as a wide receiver in limited formations. By Week 7, Wallace had caught two passes, run two end arounds, and thrown an incomplete pass on an end around option pass.

In 2008, Wallace started two pre-season games at quarterback and had good statistics against the Minnesota Vikings and Oakland Raiders. After injuries to wide receivers that hurt the Seattle Seahawks, Wallace was moved to that position but strained a calf in his first game.

After the injury of Hasselbeck, he returned as a starter in week seven of the season at Tampa Bay, where the team lost 20–10. The next week, he led his team to a 34–13 win over San Francisco. In week 9, Wallace threw for the longest touchdown pass in Seattle Seahawks franchise history with a 90-yard completion to Koren Robinson in the Seahawks' first play from scrimmage. However, the Seahawks lost to the Philadelphia Eagles, 26–7. Wallace played again in the 21–19 road loss to the Miami Dolphins in week ten. Hasselbeck was cleared by team doctors to play and was the starter again for week 11. Because of another injury to Hasselbeck, Wallace started in week 14 against the New England Patriots, where he threw 20 completions in 28 attempts for 212 yards and three touchdowns. His passer rating for the game was 128.9. He also ran for 47 yards on three carries. However, a lost fumble by Wallace late in the fourth quarter led to a 24–21 Seahawks loss. The following week, he captured his second win as a starter as the Seahawks beat the St. Louis Rams 23–20 at the Edward Jones Dome. Hasselbeck returned from injury, but Wallace remained the starter for the rest of the season. Wallace had another good performance in a victory against the New York Jets in week 16, but lost to the eventual NFC champion Arizona Cardinals in week 17.

In his limited action, Wallace ended the 2008 NFL season as the league leader in Passing Touchdown to Interception Ratio, with 3.67.

Cleveland Browns
On March 8, 2010, Wallace was traded to the Cleveland Browns for a seventh round pick in the 2011 NFL Draft. With this trade, Wallace was reunited with his former Seattle coach and then-Browns president Mike Holmgren. He made his regular-season debut September 12, 2010, after starting quarterback Jake Delhomme injured his ankle during a week 1 loss to the Tampa Bay Buccaneers. He would go on to start the next four games before suffering a high ankle sprain during week 5 versus the Atlanta Falcons. On March 3, 2011, Wallace signed a three-year deal with the Browns. Wallace was released by the Cleveland Browns after the conclusion of the 2012 preseason.

New Orleans Saints
On April 15, 2013, the New Orleans Saints signed Wallace to a one-year deal. On August 19, 2013, he was released by the Saints.

San Francisco 49ers
On August 22, 2013, he signed a one-year deal with the San Francisco 49ers. A week later on August 29, 2013, he asked for his release. He later said that (contrary to some news reports) he was not retiring, but had decided to leave the 49ers because he felt they were not giving him a chance to make the team, and had signed him only to pressure their principal backup quarterback, Colt McCoy, to accept a pay cut.

Green Bay Packers

On September 2, 2013, Wallace signed with the Green Bay Packers. He first played for the Packers on November 4, 2013 after an injury to the left shoulder of Aaron Rodgers in the first quarter of the Monday night game against the Chicago Bears. His first start for the Packers was on Sunday, November 10, 2013 against the Philadelphia Eagles. During the game's opening drive, Wallace suffered a season-ending groin injury and had to leave the game. He was replaced by quarterback Scott Tolzien, who made his first regular-season NFL appearance.

Seneca Wallace was the first ever African-American to start a game as quarterback for the Green Bay Packers.

NFL career statistics

Coaching career

Episcopal School of Dallas
From 2017 to 2021 Seneca coached at the Episcopal School of Dallas as an assistant coach.

Dallas Cowboys
Wallace joined the Dallas Cowboys staff in 2020 as a camp assistant working with the quarterbacks.

John Paul II High School
In 2022, Wallace was an assistant coach for John Paul II High School.

Post-career
In the summer of 2018, Wallace was the quarterback for Godspeed, a flag football team made of former professional American football players that participated in the American Flag Football League (AFFL). The team were crowned the champions of participating pro teams but lost in the final match to the amateur champion team.

See also
 Racial issues faced by black quarterbacks

References

External links
Seattle Seahawks bio

1980 births
Living people
People from Rancho Cordova, California
Players of American football from California
African-American players of American football
American football quarterbacks
Iowa State Cyclones football players
Seattle Seahawks players
Sportspeople from Sacramento County, California
Cleveland Browns players
New Orleans Saints players
San Francisco 49ers players
Green Bay Packers players
Sacramento City Panthers football players
21st-century African-American sportspeople
20th-century African-American people
Ed Block Courage Award recipients